Razor clam is a common name for long, narrow, saltwater clams (which resemble a closed straight razor in shape), in the genera Ensis, Siliqua, Solecurtus, and Solen, including:

Atlantic jackknife clam, Ensis directus
Razor shell, Ensis arcuatus
Siliqua alta, the northern or Arctic razor clam
Siliqua costata, Atlantic razor clam
Pacific razor clam, Siliqua patula
Gould's razor shell, Solen strictus
Rosy razor clam, Solecurtus strigilatus

See also
Jackknife clam

Mollusc common names